Gharu Ram Bhagat is an Indian politician from Jammu and Kashmir and member of Democratic Azad Party. Bhagat was a member of the Jammu and Kashmir Legislative Assembly from the Ranbir Singhpura constituency in Jammu district. He was affiliated with Bhartiya Janata Party until 2016. In 2016, he joined Indian National Congress. On 30 August 2022, he resigned from Congress in support of Ghulam Nabi Azad.

References 

People from Jammu
Bharatiya Janata Party politicians from Jammu and Kashmir
Jammu and Kashmir MLAs 2008–2014
Living people
21st-century Indian politicians
Year of birth missing (living people)